The Tomb Within is an EP by the American death metal band Autopsy, released September 13, 2010, through Peaceville Records on CD and 12" vinyl. The 12" vinyl edition of The Tomb Within, limited to 1000 numbered copies, came with a free poster of cover artwork.

Track listing
All songs written by Chris Reifert and Eric Cutler.

Personnel
 Chris Reifert – drums, vocals
 Danny Coralles – guitar
 Eric Cutler – guitar
 Joe Trevisano – bass

References

Autopsy (band) albums
2010 EPs